Brett Riley is an American ice hockey coach and former player. He is currently the head coach LIU and was previously an assistant at Colgate.

Career
Riley began his college hockey career as a player at Hobart. In four years with the Statesmen Riley played only sparingly, appearing in just 22 games and scoring twice, but was a three-time academic All-American. After graduating with degree in history, Riley began his coaching career at The Albany Academy, leading the program while also serving as a scout for the Charlottetown Islanders, a team in the QMJHL. In 2017 he returned to college hockey, becoming the first head coach for Wilkes University, and had a full year to prepare for its inaugural season in 2018–19.

When Wilkes hit the ice, the team performed well, finished in a tie for 3rd in the UCHC, but lost their quarterfinal game in the conference tournament. After just one season with Wilkes, Riley was hired as an assistant coach by Colgate, working under one of the most respected men in Division I hockey, Don Vaughan. Riley's tenure with the team saw the Raiders achieve moderate gains, rising from 10th in ECAC Hockey to 8th and won its first playoff round in five years. Unfortunately, due to the COVID-19 pandemic, Colgate's season ended prematurely.

Despite his brief tenure at the top level of competition, Riley was brought in to be the first head coach for yet another program. This time he signed on to lead the LIU Sharks beginning with the 2020–21 season.

Personal
Riley is part of a legendary college hockey family, with his father, uncle and grandfather all having coached Army since 1950. His father Rob also won a Division III National Championship in 1984 while his grandfather Jack coached the US National team to a gold medal at the 1960 Winter Olympics.

College head coaching record

References

External links

1991 births
Living people
American ice hockey coaches
LIU Sharks men's ice hockey coaches
People from Needham, Massachusetts
Ice hockey people from Massachusetts
The Governor's Academy alumni